Murad or Mourad is an Arabic name. It is also common in Armenian, Azerbaijani, Bengali, Turkish, Persian, and Berber as a male given name or surname and is commonly used throughout the Muslim world and Middle East.

Etymology
It is derived from the Arabic Semitic triliteral root رود (r-w-d). Its Arabic meaning can be translated roughly into wanted, desired, wished for, yearned or goal.

Given name

Ottoman sultans
Murad I (1326–1389), often nicknamed Hüdavendigâr—from Persian:  Khodāvandgār —"the devotee of God", the third sultan. Received the name Murad through a play on the Arabic word "mordd", which means "wish" or "desire".
Murad II (1404–1451)
Murad III (1546–1595)
Murad IV (1612–1640)
Murad V (1840–1904)

Others
Murad
Mawlana Murad, Islamic scholar
Şehzade Murad, Ottoman prince
Murad,  Veteran Bollywood Indian Actor
Murad Artin (born 1960), Armenian-Swedish politician
Murad Mirza, second son of Mughal Emperor Akbar
Murad Baksh (died 1661), youngest son of Mughal Emperor Shah Jahan and Empress Mumtaz Mahal
Murad Bey (1750–1801), Egyptian Mamluk chieftain
Murad Qureshi, British Bangladeshi Labour Party politician
Murad Umakhanov (born 1977), Russian wrestler and Olympian
Murad Wilfried Hofmann  (1931 – 2020) German diplomat and author.

Mourad
Mourad the Great, nickname of Hampartsoum Boyadjian, an Armenian fedayee and political activist
Mourad Benchellali, French citizen captured and detained in the Guantanamo Bay detention camps
Mourad Bouzidi, Dutch–Tunisian kickboxer
Mourad Daami, Tunisian football referee
Mourad Daoudi El Ghezouani, Moroccan footballer
Mourad Ikhlef, Algerian arrested and deported from Canada on allegations of past involvement with the Armed Islamic Group and a connection to Ahmed Ressam
Mourad Marofit (born 1982), Moroccan long-distance runner
Mourad Medelci, Algerian politician
Mourad Meghni, Algerian footballer
Mourad Salem, Tunisian artist based in France
Mourad Topalian, Armenian-American political activist

Morad
Morad Fareed, New York–based entrepreneur and former athlete
Morad Mohammadi, Iranian wrestler and Olympian.
Morad Sari
Morad (Spanish rapper) (born 1999)
Morad (born 1977), French rapper in Scred Connexion

Surname
 Murad
Abdul Hakim Murad (militant), alleged conspirator in the planned attacks called Operation Bojinka
Abdal Hakim Murad (born: Timothy John Winter, 1960) English academic, theologian and Islamic scholar
Adel Murad, Iraqi politician
Ferid Murad, American physician and pharmacologist
Hadji Murad, Avar military commander
Hilmi Murad, Egyptian politician
Mohammad Murad, Kuwaiti wildlife photographer 
Murad Ali Murad, Afghan Army officer
Nadia Murad, Iraqi Yazidi human rights activist
Murad, Veteran Bollywood Indian Actor
Raza Murad, Indian character actor, son of Murad
Sayed Noorullah Murad, an Afghan politician, military commander and former deputy minister
Timothy Winter, aka Abdal-Hakim Murad, British Islamic scholar
Waheed Murad, Pakistani film producer, writer, and actor
Zuhair Murad, a Beirut-based Lebanese fashion designer

 Mourad
Ahmed Mourad, an Egyptian author and screenwriter of fiction and non-fiction
George Mourad (born 1982), Syrian Swedish footballer of Assyrian descent
Leila Mourad (1918–1995), Egyptian singer and actress
Mounir Mourad (1922–1981), Egyptian artist, singer and actor
 Morad
Daniel Morad (born 1990), Canadian race car driver
Dashni Morad (born 1986), Kurdish singer, songwriter, television presenter, human rights & environmental activist.
Luciana Morad, also known as Luciana Gimenez, Brazilian fashion model and TV show hostess

See also
Murat (disambiguation), modern Turkish spelling of Murad
Murat (name)
Murod, an Uzbek given name
Muradian, Armenian surname
Muradyan, Armenian surname
Mrad (disambiguation)

References

Arabic-language surnames
Arabic masculine given names
Iranian masculine given names
Pakistani masculine given names
Bangladeshi masculine given names